Chapois may refer to:
 Chapois, Jura
 Chapois, Belgium